George S. Moulton was a member of the Connecticut House of Representatives in 1871 and 1877.  In 1878 he was elected to the Connecticut Senate from the Thirteenth Senatorial District.

He was born on September 13, 1829, in Mansfield, Connecticut.  His parents were Harvey Moulton and Anna M. Turner.  He married  Caroline F. Hazen and had three children.  He died June 8, 1882.  Over the course of his career he had been a director of textile companies, banks and railroads.

External links
 Bio from Windham, Connecticut History
 Political Graveyard
 Roll of State Officers and Members of General Assembly of Connecticut

Republican Party members of the Connecticut House of Representatives
Republican Party Connecticut state senators
Businesspeople from Connecticut
People from Mansfield, Connecticut
1829 births
1882 deaths
19th-century American politicians
19th-century American businesspeople